Stokka is a neighborhood (delområde) in the city of Stavanger which lies in the southwestern part of the large municipality of Stavanger in Rogaland county, Norway. It is located in the borough of Eiganes og Våland. It is located between the European route E39 highway and the lake Stokkavatnet. Stokka Church is located in this neighborhood.

Grunnkretser i Stokka:

 Stokkabrautene
 Lassa
 Nedre Stokka
 Øvre Stokka

References

Boroughs and neighbourhoods of Stavanger